Two Against the World may refer to:

Two Against the World (1932 film), featuring Constance Bennett, Neil Hamilton, and Helen Vinson
Two Against the World (1936 film), starring Humphrey Bogart, Beverly Roberts and Linda Perry